Neusiedler may refer to:

 Lake Neusiedl
 Hans Neusidler (circa 1508/9 – 1563), Hungarian-German composer and lutenist

See also 
 Neusiedl (disambiguation)
 Novosedly (disambiguation) (Czech form)